Patrick Breitkreuz (born 18 January 1992) is a German footballer who plays as a forward for VSG Altglienicke. He is the twin brother of fellow footballer Steve Breitkreuz.

In 2009, he earned two caps for the German national under-17 team.

Career
On 31 January 2020, the last day of the winter transfer period, Breitkreuz left 3. Liga side Würzburger Kickers for VSG Altglienicke who were looking to gain promotion from the Regionalliga Nordost.

References

External links
 
 Patrick Breitkreuz at kicker 

1992 births
Living people
Footballers from Berlin
German footballers
Association football forwards
Germany youth international footballers
Hertha BSC II players
Holstein Kiel players
FC Energie Cottbus players
SV Wehen Wiesbaden players
Würzburger Kickers players
VSG Altglienicke players
Regionalliga players
3. Liga players
Holstein Kiel II players